Trương Vĩnh Ký (6 December 18371 September 1898), known as Pétrus Ký and Jean-Baptiste Pétrus, was a Vietnamese scholar whose publications helped improve understanding between colonial Vietnam and Europe. His works helped popularize the romanized script of the Vietnamese language, Quốc Ngữ, leading to its officialization in the early 20th century. He served in the French colonial regime as a linguist, and also translated many literary works into modern Vietnamese.

Life
Truong Vinh Ky, also called J.B. Truong Chanh Ky, or Petrus Ky, was born on 6 December 1837 in Vinh Thanh Village, Minh Ly Canton, Tan Minh District, Vinh Long Province (now is Vinh Thanh Commune, Cho Lach District, Ben Tre Province).

His father was Commander Truong Chanh Thi, his mother was Nguyen Thi Chau. He started to learn the Mandarin language at as early as 5 years of age. When he was 9, he lost his father. In Cai Nhum at that time there was a Christian missionary teaching the Latin language. At 12, Ky studied the Christian Bible with Father Hue (or the Priest Belleveaux) and followed him to the Pinhalu School in Phnom Penh, Cambodia. In 1851, Truong was granted a scholarship by this school to study at the Penang Seminary, then the main centre of Roman Catholic training for Southeast Asian countries. At the Penang Seminary, Truong Vinh Ky showed outstanding learning skills to the ideological and knowledge on natural as well as social sciences, that even some of the famed personalities at that time were surprised and praised his excellent brainpower and erudite knowledge. He also proved himself skillful in linguistics. Beside the commonly used languages at the time such as French, English, Latin, Greek, Hindi, and Japanese, he was also proficient in Chinese, Spanish, Malay, Lao, Thai, Burmese. Truong Vinh Ky worked mainly in the cultural domain, but he also worked for 8 months at the Viện cơ mật (Secret Affairs Institute, Privy Council) in the court at Huế and another 8 months as an interpreter in the Vietnamese delegation to France. When the French troops attacked the Province of Gia Dinh in December, 1859, he was appointed as an interpreter to the Occupying forces.

Travel to Europe
In June, 1863, he accompanied Phan Thanh Gian, the chief delegator sent to France by the Hue Court to negotiate the retrieval of provinces lost into French hands. This trip was a good opportunity for Truong to meet with famous figures at the time such as Victor Hugo, Littre, Renan, and French statesmen. He was also able to visit Egypt, Portugal, Spain, Italy, etc.

The trip also gave him a broader perspective view of his own country and the plight of his fellow countrymen. Once all 6 provinces of the Cochninchine were lost to the French invaders, Truong was appointed as the first Annamite official to serve under the French protectorate.

Professor of French language
He was professor of French language at the Interpreter School (1866–1868), Chief editor for the Gia Dinh News (1868), Director of the Pedagogic School and at the same time Secretary of the City Council of Cho Lon (1872), professor in French language for the French and Spanish expats at the Collège des Administrateurs Stagiaires in 1874. In February, 1876, Truong was appointed as the Supervisor for king Đồng Khánh at the Viện cơ mật and stayed in that job until October, 1876. Then he went back to Saigon.

Later years 1886-1898

He was no longer accredited after the abrupt death of Governor-General Paul Bert on 11 November 1886, and spent most of the time doing research and teaching at the Interpreter School and the Collège des Administrateurs Stagiaires. He died on 1 September 1898, in Saigon, aged 62.  Some of people apart of his family that are alive today include Nia Truong Le and Tessa Truong Le.

During his 40 years working in the cultural field, Truong Vinh Ky created 118 works of many genres such as research, collecting, translation, transcription, tens of which were written in French. He was also a member of science societies and associations in Europe. In the time of transition and cultural intersection between West and East in Vietnam at the end of 19th and early 20th century, Truong had such a grandiose career that the French scholar J. Bouchot called him "the only scholar in Indochina and even the modern China " In Vietnam, Truong was praised as the most excellent language and cultural researcher. Though there are some ideas criticizing him for having cooperated with the French colonialists, no one ever doubts his excellent learning and profound knowledge, as well as his invaluable contributions to Vietnam's cultural development during the early days of modern civilization. There have been many research books and biographical as well as critic books about Truong Vinh Ky, his life and his works. All were published and have been reprinted many times in many ways for many later researchers to get to understand him.

Translations and publications
In the cultural area, Truong Vinh Ky was admired greatly as a scholar with broad and profound knowledge in various fields of study, both in social and natural sciences. He had considerable achievements in collecting, transcription and translation from foreign languages into Vietnamese. Some of his best-known transcription and translation works include Truyện Kiều (The Tale of Kieu), Lục Vân Tiên (written in Chinese characters as 陸雲僊, by Nguyen Dinh Chieu), Phan Trần, and Gia huấn ca (Book of Familial Educating), Lục súc tranh công (The Six Animals Vying for Services).

References

Pétrus Ky, Britannica
, Bentre

1837 births
1898 deaths
19th-century journalists
19th-century male writers
19th-century translators
19th-century Vietnamese historians
Chevaliers of the Légion d'honneur
French–Vietnamese translators
Male journalists
People from Bến Tre Province
Vietnamese journalists
Vietnamese Roman Catholics
Vietnamese translators
Vietnamese–French translators